Samuel Petty (March 15, 1842 – ?) was a local politician and state legislator in Florida. He was also a delegate to Florida's 1885 Constitutional Convention.

He served for several year on Fernandina Beach's council and represented Nassau County, Florida in the Florida House of Representatives from 1873 to 1875. When he served in the Florida House, Liberty Billings represented Fernandina in the Florida Senate. He bid on a school construction project in Fernandina.

He testified that during the 1876 election "colored" railroad employees were compelled to vote the Democratic Party ticket with marked ballots that were tracked to ensure they complied. He testified that those who did not were fired.

See also
African-American officeholders during and following the Reconstruction era

References

1842 births
Year of death missing